Elba Township may refer to the following places in the United States:

 Elba Township, Knox County, Illinois
 Elba Township, Gratiot County, Michigan
 Elba Township, Lapeer County, Michigan
 Elba Township, Winona County, Minnesota

Township name disambiguation pages